William Otto Harbach (October 12, 1919 – December 18, 2017) was an American television producer, director and author. He won four Emmy Awards  and a Peabody Award  Harbach also produced and directed special events, including eight ASCAP celebrations for renowned composers, lyricists and librettists. He was the son of American lyricist, librettist and ASCAP co-founder Otto Abels Harbach.

Early life and education

Born on October 12, 1919 to Otto Abels Harbach and Ella Smith Dougal Harbach, William Otto Harbach began life in New York City. His brother Robert (Bob) was born in February, 1921. The family moved to Mamaroneck, New York when he was six years old. His father was known as the "Dean of American Librettists," and penned tunes including Smoke Gets in Your Eyes.

Harbach attended the Horace Mann School's kindergarten and Pelham Day School. He spent five years at the Choate School (now Choate Rosemary Hall) where he met John F. Kennedy and Alan Jay Lerner. Harbach spent one year preparing for college at the Hun School of Princeton, after which he was accepted at Brown University. He spent one year at Brown before enlisting in the Coast Guard. In the spring 1946, after his military service, he was a student at The Neighborhood Playhouse.

Film career
MGM signed Harbach as a stock player during 1945–1947. He appeared in Good News with June Allyson and Peter Lawford; Killer McCoy > with Mickey Rooney; On an Island with You with Jimmy Durante, Esther Williams and Peter Lawford; and Song of the Thin Man with Jayne Meadows. A strike causing the studios to cut costs led to the elimination of stock players at MGM in 1947.

Television career
After a brief stint managing the nightclub acts Kay Thompson and the Williams Brothers, Harbach got an entry-level job in 1948 as editor at the NBC New York Studio. He spliced 35 mm film to add commercials and station breaks. Three years later he was offered the position of producer for a new show, the "Knickerbocker Beer Show".
 1958 Look Magazine TV Award for Best Novelty Series - The Steve Allen Show 
 1958 Look Magazine TV Award for Best Variety Series - The Steve Allen Show 
 1957 Look Magazine TV Award for Best Variety Series - The Steve Allen Show 
 1957 Sylvania TV Award for Outstanding Variety Series - The Steve Allen Show

On March 4, 1992, Harbach was inducted in the Producers Guild of America Hall of Fame.

References

1919 births
2017 deaths
American male film actors
American people of Danish descent
American television producers
Writers from Fairfield, Connecticut